Afroarctia bergeri is a moth of the family Erebidae. It was described by Hervé de Toulgoët in 1978. It is found in Zaire, Rwanda, Cameroon and Gabon.

References

Moths described in 1978
Erebid moths of Africa
Spilosomina